The Akaflieg Berlin B 9 was a twin-engined experimental aircraft, developed by Akaflieg Berlin and Flugtechnische Fachgruppe in the 1940s. It was designed to examine the benefits of having a pilot in a prone position. The aircraft was flown in 1943, but was eventually abandoned.

Specifications

See also

Notes

External links

1940s German experimental aircraft
Research and development in Nazi Germany
Prone pilot aircraft
Akaflieg Berlin aircraft
Aircraft first flown in 1943
Twin-engined tractor aircraft